The French campaign in Egypt and Syria (1798–1801) was Napoleon Bonaparte's campaign in the Ottoman territories of Egypt and Syria, proclaimed to defend French trade interests and to establish scientific enterprise in the region. It was the primary purpose of the Mediterranean campaign of 1798, a series of naval engagements that included the capture of Malta and the Greek island Crete, later arriving in the Port of Alexandria. The campaign ended in defeat for Napoleon, leading to the withdrawal of French troops from the region.

On the scientific front, the expedition eventually led to the discovery of the Rosetta Stone, creating the field of Egyptology. Despite early victories and an initially successful expedition into Syria, Napoleon and his Armée d'Orient were eventually defeated and forced to withdraw, especially after suffering the defeat of the supporting French fleet at the Battle of the Nile.

Preparations and voyage

Proposal
At the time of the invasion, the Directory had assumed executive power in France. It would resort to the army to maintain order in the face of the Jacobin and royalist threats, and count in particular on General Bonaparte, already a successful commander, having led the Italian campaign.

The notion of annexing Egypt as a French colony had been under discussion since François Baron de Tott undertook a secret mission to the Levant in 1777 to determine its feasibility. Baron de Tott's report was favourable, but no immediate action was taken. Nevertheless, Egypt became a topic of debate between Talleyrand and Napoleon, which continued in their correspondence during Napoleon's Italian campaign. In early 1798, Bonaparte proposed an expedition to Egypt and convinced the Directory to establish the Commission des Sciences et des Arts. He further wished to strengthen French trade interests over those of Great Britain in the Middle East, hoping to join forces with France's ally Tipu Sultan, ruler of Mysore in India and an opponent of British control in that country. As France was not ready for a head-on attack on Great Britain itself, the Directory decided to intervene indirectly and create a "double port" connecting the Red Sea to the Mediterranean Sea, prefiguring the Suez Canal.

At the time, Egypt had been an Ottoman province since 1517, but was now out of direct Ottoman control, and was in disorder, with dissension among the ruling Mamluk elite. In France, "Egyptian" fashion was in full swing – intellectuals believed that Egypt was the cradle of Western civilization and wished to conquer it. French traders already based on the Nile were complaining of harassment by the Mamluks, and Napoleon wished to walk in the footsteps of Alexander the Great. He assured the Directory that "as soon as he had conquered Egypt, he will establish relations with the Indian princes and, together with them, attack the English in their possessions." According to a 13 February report by Talleyrand, "Having occupied and fortified Egypt, we shall send force from Suez to the Sultanate of Mysore, to join the forces of Tipu Sultan and drive away the English." The Directory agreed to the plan in March, though troubled by its scope and cost. They saw that it would remove the popular and over-ambitious Napoleon from the centre of power, though this motive long remained secret.

Before departure from Toulon
Rumours became rife as 40,000 soldiers and 10,000 sailors were gathered in French Mediterranean ports. A large fleet was assembled at Toulon: 13 ships of the line, 14 frigates, and 400 transports. To avoid interception by the British fleet under Nelson, the expedition's target was kept secret. It was known only to Bonaparte himself, his generals Berthier and Caffarelli, and the mathematician Gaspard Monge. Bonaparte was the commander, with subordinates including Thomas Alexandre Dumas, Kléber, Desaix, Berthier, Caffarelli, Lannes, Damas, Murat, Andréossy, Belliard, Menou, and Zajączek. His aides de camp included his brother Louis Bonaparte, Duroc, Eugène de Beauharnais, Thomas Prosper Jullien, and the Polish nobleman Joseph Sulkowski.

The fleet at Toulon was joined by squadrons from Genoa, Civitavecchia and Bastia and was put under the command of Admiral Brueys and Contre-amirals Villeneuve, Du Chayla, Decrès and Ganteaume.

The fleet was about to set sail when a crisis developed with Austria, and
the Directory recalled Bonaparte in case war broke out. The crisis was resolved in a few weeks, and Bonaparte received orders to travel to Toulon as soon as possible. It is claimed that, in a stormy meeting with the Directory, Bonaparte threatened to dissolve them and director Reubell gave him a pen saying "Sign there, general!"

Bonaparte arrived at Toulon on 9 May, lodging with Benoît Georges de Najac, the officer in charge of preparing the fleet. The army embarked confident in their commander's talent and on 19 May, just as he embarked, Bonaparte addressed the troops, especially those who had served under him in the Armée d'Italie:
Soldiers! You are one of the wings of the French army. You have made war on the mountains, on the plains, and in cities; it remains for you to fight on the seas. The Roman legions, that you sometimes imitated but no longer equalled, fought Carthage now on this same sea and now on the plains of Zama... Soldiers, sailors, you have been neglected until this day; today, the greatest concern of the Republic is for you... The genius of liberty, which made you, at her birth, the arbiter of Europe, wants to be genius of the seas and the furthest nations.

Capture of Malta

When Napoleon's fleet arrived off Malta, Napoleon demanded that the Knights of Malta allow his fleet to enter the port and take on water and supplies. Grand Master von Hompesch replied that only two foreign ships would be allowed to enter the port at a time. Under that restriction, re-victualling the French fleet would take weeks, and it would be vulnerable to the British fleet of Admiral Nelson. Napoleon therefore ordered the invasion of Malta.

The French Revolution had significantly reduced the Knights' income and their ability to put up serious resistance. Half of the Knights were French, and most of these knights refused to fight.

French troops disembarked in Malta at seven points on the morning of 11 June. General Louis Baraguey d'Hilliers landed soldiers and cannon in the western part of the main island of Malta, under artillery fire from Maltese fortifications. The French troops met some initial resistance but pressed forward. The Knights' ill-prepared force in that region, numbering only about 2,000, regrouped. The French pressed on with their attack. After a fierce gun battle lasting twenty-four hours, most of the Knights' force in the west surrendered. Napoleon, during his stay in Malta, resided at Palazzo Parisio in Valletta.

Napoleon then opened negotiations. Faced with vastly superior French forces and the loss of western Malta, von Hompesch surrendered the main fortress of Valletta.

Alexandria to Syria

Disembarkment at Alexandria

Napoleon departed Malta for Egypt. After successfully eluding detection by the Royal Navy for thirteen days, the fleet was in sight of Alexandria where it landed on 1 July, although Napoleon's plan had been to land elsewhere.
On the day of the landing, Napoleon told his troops "I promise to each soldier who returns from this expedition, enough to purchase six arpents of land." (approximately 7.6 acres or 3.1 ha) and added:
The peoples we will be living alongside are Muslims; their first article of faith is "There is no other god but God, and Mahomet is his prophet". Do not contradict them; treat them as you treated the Jews, the Italians; respect their muftis and their imams, as you respected their rabbis and bishops. Have the same tolerance for the ceremonies prescribed by the Quran, for their mosques, as you had for the convents, for the synagogues, for the religion of Moses and that of Jesus Christ. The Roman legions used to protect all religions. You will here find different customs to those of Europe, you must get accustomed to them. The people among whom we are going treat women differently to us; but in every country whoever violates one is a monster. Pillaging only enriches a small number of men; it dishonours us, it destroys our resources; it makes enemies of the people who it is in our interest to have as our friends. The first city we will encounter was built by Alexander [the Great]. We shall find at every step great remains worthy of exciting French emulation.

On 1 July, Napoleon, aboard the ship L'Orient en route to Egypt, wrote the following proclamation to the Muslim inhabitants of Alexandria:
For too long the beys who govern Egypt have insulted the French nation and covered their traders in slanders. The hour of their punishment has come. For too long this horde of slaves, bought in the Caucasus and Georgia, have tyrannised the most beautiful part of the world; but God, on whom all depends, has ordained that their empire shall end. People of Egypt, they have told you that I come to destroy your religion, but do not believe it; [tell them] in reply [that] I come to restore your rights, punish the usurpers and that I respect God, his prophet and the Quran more than the Mamluks. Tell them that all men are equal before God; wisdom, talents, virtues are the only things to make one man different from another... Is there a more beautiful land? It belongs to the Mamluks. If Egypt is their farm, then they should show the lease that God gave them for it... Cadis, cheiks, imans, tchorbadjis, and notables of the nation [I ask you to] tell the people that we are true friends of Muslims. Wasn't it us who destroyed the Knights of Malta? Wasn't it us who destroyed the Pope who used to say that he had a duty to make war on Muslims? Wasn't it us who have at all times been friends to the Great Lord and enemies to his enemies? ... Thrice happy are those who will be with us! They shall prosper in their fortune and in their rank. Happy are those who will be neutral! They will get to know us over time, and join their ranks with ours. But unhappy, thrice unhappy, are those who shall arm themselves [to fight] for the Mamluks and who shall fight against us! There shall be no hope for them, they shall perish.Cairo, Nezar AlSayyad, p174

Despite the idealistic promises proclaimed by Napoleon, Egyptian intellectuals like 'Abd al-Rahman al-Jabarti (1753–1825 C.E/ 1166–1240 A.H) were heavily critical of Napoleon's objectives. As a major chronicler of the French invasion, Jabarti decried the French invasion of Egypt as the start of:"fierce fights and important incidents; of the momentous mishaps and appalling afflictions, of the multiplication of malice and the acceleration of affairs; of successive sufferings and turning times; of the inversion of the innate and the elimination of the established; of horrors upon horrors and contradicting conditions; of the perversion of all precepts and the onset of annihilation; of the dominance of destruction and the occurrence of occasions"

Menou had been the first to set out for Egypt, and was the first Frenchman to land. Bonaparte and Kléber landed together and joined Menou at night at the cove of Marabout (Citadel of Qaitbay), on which the first French tricolour to be hoisted in Egypt was raised.

On the night of the 1st of July, Bonaparte who was informed that Alexandria intended to resist him, rushed to get a force ashore without waiting for the artillery or the cavalry to land, in which he marched on Alexandria at the head of 4,000 to 5,000 men. At 2 am, 2 July, he set off marching in three columns, on the left, Menou attacked the "triangular fort", where he received seven wounds, while Kléber was in the centre, in which he received a bullet in the forehead but was only wounded, and Louis André Bon on the right attacked the city gates. Alexandria was defended by Koraim Pasha and 500 men. However, after a rather lively shooting in the city, the defenders gave up and fled. The city had not had time to surrender and put itself at the French's discretion but, despite Bonaparte's orders, the French soldiers broke into the city.

When the whole expeditionary force had been disembarked, Admiral Brueys received orders to take the fleet to Aboukir Bay before anchoring the battle-fleet in the old port of Alexandria if possible or taking it to Corfu. These precautions were made vital by the imminent arrival of the British fleet, which had already been seen near Alexandria 24 hours before the French fleet's arrival. It was wisest to avoid the risks of a naval battle – a defeat could have disastrous results and it was in the force's better interests to go by land, marching at top speed to Cairo to frighten the enemy commanders and surprise them before they could put any defence measures in place.

Victory on land, defeat at sea

Louis Desaix marched across the desert with his division and two cannon, arriving at Demenhour,  from Alexandria, on 18 Messidor (6 July). Meanwhile, Bonaparte left Alexandria, leaving the city under Kléber's command. General Dugua marched on Rosetta, with orders to seize and hold the entrance to the port housing the French fleet, which had to follow the route to Cairo down the river's left bank and rejoin the army at Rahmanié. On 20 Messidor (8 July), Bonaparte arrived at Demenhour, where he found the forces that had met up, and on 22 Messidor they marched to Rahmanié, where they then awaited the fleet with their provisions. The fleet arrived on 24 Messidor (12 July) and the army began to march again at night, followed by the fleet.

The winds' violence suddenly forced the fleet to the army's left and straight into the enemy fleet, which was supported by musket fire from 4,000 Mamluks, reinforced by peasants and Arabs. The French fleet had numerical superiority but still lost its gunboats to the enemy. Attracted by the sound of gunfire, Bonaparte ordered his land force to the charge and attacked the village of Chebreiss, which was captured after two hours' fierce fighting. The enemy fled in disorder towards Cairo, leaving 600 dead on the battlefield.

After a day's rest at Chebreiss, the French land force continued the pursuit. On 2 Thermidor (20 July), it arrived  from the village of Embabé. He is said to have shown his army the pyramids behind the enemy's left flank and at the moment of ordering the attack shouted "Soldiers, see the tops of the Pyramids" – in accounts written long afterwards, this phrase was altered into "Soldiers, remember that from the top of these pyramids, 40 centuries of history contemplate you." This was the start of the so-called Battle of the Pyramids, a French victory over an enemy force of about 21,000 Mamluks. (Around 40,000 Mamluk soldiers stayed away from the battle.) The French defeated the Mamluk cavalry with a giant infantry square, with cannons and supplies safely on the inside. In all 300 French and approximately 6,000 Mamluks were killed. The battle gave rise to dozens of stories and drawings.

Dupuy's brigade pursued the routed enemy and at night entered Cairo, which had been abandoned by the beys Mourad and Ibrahim. On 4 Thermidor (22 July), the notables of Cairo came to Giza to meet Bonaparte and offered to hand over the city to him. Three days later, he moved his main headquarters there. Desaix was ordered to follow Mourad, who had set off for Upper Egypt. An observation corps was put in place at Elkanka to keep an eye on the movements of Ibrahim, who was heading towards Syria. Bonaparte personally led the pursuit of Ibrahim, beat him at Salahie and pushed him completely out of Egypt.

The transports had sailed back to France, but the battle fleet stayed and supported the army along the coast. The British fleet under the command of Horatio Nelson had been searching in vain for the French fleet for weeks. The British fleet had not found it in time to prevent the landings in Egypt, but on 1 August Nelson discovered the French warships anchored in a strong defensive position in the Bay of Abukir. The French believed that they were open to attack only on one side, the other side being protected by the shore. During the Battle of the Nile the arriving British fleet under Horatio Nelson managed to slip half of their ships in between the land and the French line, thus attacking from both sides. In a few hours 11 out of the 13 French ships of the line and 2 out of the 4 French frigates were captured or destroyed; the four remaining ships fled. This frustrated Bonaparte's goal of strengthening the French position in the Mediterranean Sea, and instead put it totally under British control. News of the naval defeat reached Bonaparte en route back to Cairo from defeating Ibrahim but, far from being worried, Mullié states:
This disastrous event did not disconcert [Bonaparte] at all – ever impenetrable, he did not allow any emotion to appear that he had not tested in his mind. Having calmly read the despatch which informed him that he and his army were now prisoners in Egypt, he said "We no longer have a navy. Well! We'll have to stay here, or leave as great men just as the ancients did". The army then showed itself happy at this short energetic response, but the native Egyptians considered the defeat at Aboukir as fortune turning in their favour and so from then on busied themselves to find means to throw off the hateful yoke the foreigners were trying to impose on them by force and to hunt them from their country. This project was soon put into execution.After the Battle of Pyramids, Napoleon instituted a French administration in Cairo and suppressed the subsequent rebellions violently. Although Napoleon tried to co-opt local Egyptian ulema, scholars like Al-Jabarti poured scorn on the ideas and cultural ways of the French. Despite their cordial proclamations to the natives, with some French soldiers even converting to Islam, clerics like Abdullah al-Sharqawi condemned the French as:"‘materialist, libertine philosophers … they deny the Resurrection, and the afterlife, and … [the] prophets"

Bonaparte's administration of Egypt

After the naval defeat at Aboukir, Bonaparte's campaign remained land-bound. His army still succeeded in consolidating power in Egypt, although it faced repeated nationalist uprisings, and Napoleon began to behave as absolute ruler of all Egypt. He set up a pavilion and from within it presided over a fête du Nil – it was he who gave the signal to throw into the floats the statue of the river's fiancée, his name and Mohammed's were mingled in the same acclamations, on his orders gifts were distributed to the people, and he gave kaftans to his main officers.

In a largely unsuccessful effort to gain the support of the Egyptian population, Bonaparte issued proclamations that cast him as a liberator of the people from Ottoman and Mamluk oppression, praising the precepts of Islam and claiming friendship between France and the Ottoman Empire despite French intervention in the breakaway state. This position as a liberator initially gained him solid support in Egypt and later led to admiration for Napoleon from the Albanian Muhammad Ali of Egypt, who succeeded where Bonaparte had not in reforming Egypt and declaring its independence from the Ottomans. In a letter to a sheikh in August, Napoleon wrote, "I hope... I shall be able to unite all the wise and educated men of all the countries and establish a uniform regime based on the principles of the Quran which alone are true and which alone can lead men to happiness." Bonaparte's secretary Bourienne wrote that his employer had no serious interest in Islam or any other religion beyond their political value.
Bonaparte's principle was... to look upon religions as the work of men, but to respect them everywhere as a powerful engine of government... If Bonaparte spoke as a Mussulman (Muslim), it was merely in his character of a military and political chief in a Mussulman country. To do so was essential to his success, to the safety of his army, and... to his glory... In India he would have been for Ali, at Thibet for the Dalai-lama, and in China for Confucius."

Shortly after Bonaparte's return from facing Ibrahim came Mohammed's birthday, which was celebrated with great pomp. Bonaparte himself directed the military parades for the occasion, preparing for this festival in the sheik's house wearing oriental dress and a turban. It was on this occasion that the divan granted him the title Ali-Bonaparte after Bonaparte proclaimed himself "a worthy son of the Prophet" and "favourite of Allah". Around the same time he took severe measures to protect pilgrim caravans from Egypt to Mecca, writing a letter himself to the governor of Mecca.

Even so, thanks to the taxes he imposed on them to support his army, the Egyptians remained unconvinced of the sincerity of all Bonaparte's attempts at conciliation and continued to attack him ceaselessly. Any means, even sudden attacks and assassination, were allowed to force the "infidels" out of Egypt. Military executions were unable to deter these attacks and they continued.

22 September was the anniversary of the founding of the First French Republic and Bonaparte organised the most magnificent celebration possible. On his orders, an immense circus was built in the largest square in Cairo, with 105 columns (each with a flag bearing the name of a département) round the edge and a colossal inscribed obelisk at the centre. On seven classical altars were inscribed the names of heroes killed in the French Revolutionary Wars. Two triumphal arches were built to commemorate the campaign: a wooden arc de triomphe in Azbakiyya Square, and a second arch which was inscribed with the words "There is no god but God, and Muhammad is his prophet" and decorated by the Geonese artist Michel Rigo with scenes from the Battle of the Pyramids. Here there was some awkwardness – the painting flattered the French but aggrieved the defeated Egyptians they were trying to win over as allies.

On the day of the festival, Bonaparte addressed his troops, enumerating their exploits since the 1793 siege of Toulon and telling them:
From the English, famous for arts and commerce, to the hideous and fierce Bedouin, you have caught the gaze of the world. Soldiers, your destiny is fair... This day, 40 million citizens celebrate the era of representative government, 40 million citizens think of you.
The speech was followed by cries of "Vive la République!" and a cannon volley. Later, Bonaparte held a feast for two hundred people in a garden in Cairo and sent soldiers to plant a French flag on the top of a pyramid.

Napoleon's administration of Egypt is important in Coptic history. On 30 July 1798, just a few days after his arrival, he appointed Jirjis Al-Jawhary (brother of Ibrahim El-Gohary and the most prominent Coptic layperson) as General Steward of Egypt. In his Declaration to the Coptic Nation, Napoleon elevated them from dhimmi to equal citizens, permitting them to “carry weapons, mount mules or horses, wear turbans and dress in whatever way they like”. He also punished those who had killed Copts in the chaos following the French arrival. In return, he demanded that the Copts show “zeal and fidelity in the service of the (French) Republic”. On 21 December 1798, he appointed four Coptic members to his new consultative assembly that replaced the first assemblies, and which did not include Copts, and which he had to abolish soon after the First Cairo Revolution.

Pursuit of Mamluks
After his defeat at the Pyramids, Mourad Bey retreated to Upper Egypt. On 25 August 1798, General Desaix embarked at the head of his division on a flotilla and sailed up the Nile. On 31 August, Desaix arrived at Beni Suef where he began to encounter supply problems, then he went up the Nile to Behneseh and progressed towards Minya. The Mamluks did not fight, and the flotilla returned on September 12 at the entrance of Bahr Yussef. Desaix learned that the Mamluks were in the plain of Faiyum by 24 September.

The first contact between the two sides occurred on 3 October and a second minor fight took place, which began to deplete food and ammunition of the French forces.

On 7 October, Mourad Bey's troops came out of Sédiman's entrenchments and attacked the French, who formed themselves into three squares, one large and two small at its angles. The Mamluks as previous encounters attacked furiously but were repulsed. The Mamluks attempted to use their four cannons, but a vigorous attack led by Captain Jean Rapp managed to capture them.

After several hours of fighting, the French went on the offensive and the Mamluks fled southwards.

Revolt of Cairo

In 1798, Napoleon led the French army into Egypt, swiftly conquering Alexandria and Cairo. However, in October of that year, discontent against the French led to an uprising by the people of Cairo. While Bonaparte was in Old Cairo, the city's population began spreading weapons around to one another and fortifying strongpoints, especially at the Al-Azhar Mosque. A French commander, Dominique Dupuy, was killed by the revolting Cairenes, as well as Bonaparte's Aide-de-camp, Joseph Sulkowski. Excited by the sheikhs and imams, the local citizens swore by the Prophet to exterminate all and any Frenchman they met, and all Frenchmen they encountered – at home or in the streets – were mercilessly slaughtered. Crowds rallied at the city gates to keep out Bonaparte, who was repulsed and forced to take a detour to get in via the Boulaq gate.

The French army's situation was critical – the British were threatening French control of Egypt after their victory at the Battle of the Nile, Murad Bey and his army were still in the field in Upper Egypt, and the generals Menou and Dugua were only just able to maintain control of Lower Egypt. The Ottoman peasants had common cause with those rising against the French in Cairo – the whole region was in revolt. A manifesto of the Great Lord was published widely throughout Egypt, stating:

The French responded by setting up cannons in the Citadel and firing them at areas containing rebel forces. During the night, French soldiers advanced around Cairo and destroyed any barricades and fortifications they came across. The rebels soon began to be pushed back by the strength of the French forces, gradually losing control of their areas of the city. Bonaparte personally hunted down rebels from street to street and forced them to seek refuge in the Al-Azhar Mosque. Bonaparte said that "He [i.e God] is too late – you've begun, now I will finish!". He then immediately ordered his cannon to open fire on the Mosque. The French broke down the gates and stormed into the building, massacring the inhabitants. At the end of the revolt 5,000 to 6,000 Cairenes were dead or wounded.

Syria

Canal of the Pharaohs

With Egypt quiet again and under his control, Bonaparte used this time of rest to visit Suez and see with his own eyes the possibility of a canal (known as the Canal of the Pharaohs) said to have been cut in antiquity between the Red Sea and the Nile by order of the pharaohs. Before setting out on the expedition, he gave Cairo back its self-government as a token of its pardon – a new 'divan' made up of 60 members replaced the military commission.

Then, accompanied by his colleagues from the Institut, Berthollet, Monge, Le Père, Dutertre, Costaz, Caffarelli, and followed by a 300-man escort, Bonaparte set out for the Red Sea and after three days' marching across the desert he and his caravan arrived at Suez. After giving orders to complete the fortifications at Suez, Bonaparte crossed the Red Sea and on 28 December moved into Sinai to look for the celebrated mountains of Moses 17 kilometres from Suez. On his return, surprised by the rising tide, he ran the risk of drowning. Arriving back at Suez, after much exploration the expedition fulfilled its aim, finding the remains of the ancient canal built by Senusret III and Necho II.

Ottoman offensives

In the meantime the Ottomans in Constantinople (modern-day Istanbul) received news of the French fleet's destruction at Aboukir and believed this spelled the end for Bonaparte and his expedition, trapped in Egypt. Sultan Selim III decided to wage war against France, and sent two armies to Egypt. The first army, under the command of Jezzar Pasha, had set out with 12,000 soldiers; but was reinforced with troops from Damascus, Aleppo, Iraq (10,000 men), and Jerusalem (8,000 men). The second army, under the command of Mustafa Pasha, began on Rhodes with about eight thousand soldiers. He also knew he would get about 42,000 soldiers from Albania, Constantinople, Asia Minor, and Greece. The Ottomans planned two offensives against Cairo: from Syria, across the desert of El Salheya-Bilbeis-Al Khankah, and from Rhodes by sea landing in the Aboukir area or the port city of Damietta.

French response
In January 1799, during the canal expedition, the French learned of the hostile Ottoman movements and that Jezzar had seized the desert fort of El-Arish  from Syria's frontier with Egypt, which he was in charge of guarding. Certain that war with the Ottoman sultan was imminent and that he would be unable to defend against the Ottoman army, Bonaparte decided that his best defence would be to attack them first in Syria, where a victory would give him more time to prepare against the Ottoman forces on Rhodes.

He prepared around 13,000 soldiers who were organised in divisions under the command of Generals Reynier (with 2,160 men), Kléber (with 2,336), Bon (2,449), Lannes (2,938), a cavalry division under General Murat (900), a brigade of infantry and cavalry under Brigade chief Bessières (400), a camel company (89), artillery under Dommartin (1,387), and engineers and sappers under Caffarelli (3,404). Every infantry and cavalry division had 6 cannons. Napoleon took 16 siege cannons which were placed on ships in Damietta under the command of Captain Standelet. He also ordered contre-amiral Perrée to Jaffa with siege artillery pieces. The total artillery sent on the campaign was 80 cannon.

Regnier and the vanguard quickly arrived before Arish, captured it, destroyed part of the garrison and forced the rest to take refuge in the castle. At the same time he caused Ibrahim's mamluks to flee and captured their camp. Bonaparte's French forces left Egypt on 5 February and, seven days after leaving Cairo, Bonaparte too arrived at Arish and bombarded one of the castle towers. The garrison surrendered two days later and some of the garrison joined the French army.

Jaffa

This city was surrounded by high walls flanked by towers. Jezzar had entrusted its defence to elite troops, with the artillery manned by 1,200 Ottoman gunners. The city was one of the ways into Syria, its port could be used by his fleet and a large part of the expedition's success depended on its fall. This meant Bonaparte had to capture the city before advancing further, and so he laid siege to it from 3–7 March.

All the outer works were in the besiegers' power and a breach could be produced. When Bonaparte sent a Turk to the city's commander to demand his surrender, the commander beheaded him despite the envoy's neutrality and ordered a sortie. He was repulsed and on the evening of the same day the besiegers' cannonballs caused one of the towers to crumble. Despite the defenders' desperate resistance, Jaffa fell. Two days and two nights of carnage were enough to assuage the French soldiers' fury  – 4,500 prisoners were shot or beheaded by an executioner taken on in Egypt. This vengeful execution found apologists, who wrote that Napoleon could neither afford to hold such a large number of prisoners nor let them escape to rejoin Jezzar's ranks.

Before leaving Jaffa, Bonaparte set up a divan for the city along with a large hospital on the site of the Carmelite monastery at Mount Carmel to treat those of his soldiers who had caught the plague, whose symptoms had been seen among them since the start of the siege. A report from generals Bon and Rampon on the plague's spread worried Bonaparte. To calm his army, it is said he went into the sufferers' rooms, spoke with and consoled the sick and touched them, saying "See, it's nothing", then left the hospital and told those who thought his actions unwise "It was my duty, I'm commander-in-chief". Some later historians state that Napoleon avoided touching or even meeting plague-sufferers to avoid catching it and that his visits to the sick were invented by later Napoleonic propaganda. For example, long after the campaign, Antoine-Jean Gros produced the commissioned painting Bonaparte Visiting the Plague Victims of Jaffa in 1804. This showed Napoleon touching a sick man's body, modelling him on an Ancien Régime king-healer touching sufferers from the "King's Evil" during his coronation rites – this was no coincidence, since 1804 was the year Napoleon Bonaparte crowned himself emperor.

Mount Tabor

From Jaffa the army set off for the coastal town of Acre. En route it captured Haifa and the munitions and provisions stored there, along with the castle at Jaffe, the castle at Nazareth and even the town of Tyre much farther up the coast. The siege of Acre began on 18 March but the French were unable to take it and it was here that the Syrian campaign came to an abrupt halt. The city was defended by newly created Ottoman modern, elite infantry (Nizam-ı Cedid) under the command of Jezzar Pasha and was right on the coast, enabling it to be reinforced and resupplied by the British and Ottoman fleets.

After sixty days' repeated attacks and two murderous and inconclusive assaults, the city remained uncaptured. Even so, it was still awaiting reinforcements by sea as well as a large army forming up in Asia on the sultan's orders to march against the French. To find out the latter's movements, Jezzar ordered a general sortie against Bonaparte's camp. This sortie was supported by its own artillery and a naval bombardment from the British. With his usual impetuosity, Bonaparte pushed Jezzar's columns back against their own walls and then went to help Kléber, who was retrenched in the ruins with 4,000 Frenchmen under his command against 20,000 Ottomans at Mount Tabor. Bonaparte conceived a trick which used all the advantages offered him by the enemy position, sending Murat and his cavalry across the River Jordan to defend the river crossing and Vial and Rampon to march on Nablus, while Bonaparte himself put his troops between the Ottomans and the magazines. These manoeuvres were successful, in what was known as the Battle of Mount Tabor. The enemy army, taken by surprise at many points at once, was routed and forced to retreat, leaving their camels, tents, provisions and 5,000 dead on the battlefield.

Acre

Returning to besiege Acre, Bonaparte learned that Rear-Admiral Perrée had landed seven siege artillery pieces at Jaffa. Bonaparte then ordered two assaults, both vigorously repulsed. A fleet was sighted flying the Ottoman flag and Bonaparte realised he must capture the city before that fleet arrived with reinforcements. A fifth general attack was ordered, which took the outer works, planted the French tricolour on the rampart, pushed the Ottomans back into the city and forced the Ottoman fire to relent. Acre was thus taken or about to capitulate.

One of those fighting on the Ottoman side was the French émigré and engineer officer Phélippeaux, one of Bonaparte's classmates at the École Militaire. Phélippeaux ordered cannon to be placed in the most advantageous positions and new trenches dug as if by magic behind the ruins which Bonaparte's forces had captured. At the same time Sidney Smith, commander of the British fleet, and his ships' crews landed. These factors renewed the courage of the besieged and they pushed Bonaparte's force back, with stubborn fury on both sides. Three final consecutive assaults were all repulsed, convincing Bonaparte that it would be unwise to continue trying to capture Acre. He raised the siege in May and consoled his soldiers with the proclamation:
After feeding the war for three months in the heart of Syria with a handful of men, taking forty guns, fifty flags, 10,000 prisoners, razing the fortifications of Gaza, Kaïffa, Jaffa, Acre, we shall return to Egypt.

Retreat from Acre
The French force's situation was now critical – the enemy could harass its rear as it retreated, it was tired and hungry in the desert, and it was carrying a large number of plague-sufferers. To carry these sufferers in the middle of the army would spread the disease, so they had to be carried in the rear, where they were most at risk from the fury of the Ottomans, keen to avenge the massacres at Jaffa. There were two hospital depots, one in the large hospital on Mount Carmel and the other at Jaffa. On Bonaparte's orders, all those at Mount Carmel were evacuated to Jaffa and Tantura. The gun horses were abandoned before Acre and Bonaparte and all his officers handed their horses over to the transport officer Daure, with Bonaparte walking to set an example.

To conceal its withdrawal from the siege, the army set off at night. Arriving at Jaffa, Bonaparte ordered three evacuations of the plague sufferers to three different points – one by sea to Damietta, one by land to Gaza and another by land to Arish. During the retreat the army picked clean all the lands through which they passed, with livestock, crops and houses all being destroyed. Gaza was the only place to be spared, in return for remaining loyal to Bonaparte. To speed the retreat, Napoleon suggested the controversial step of euthanizing his own soldiers who were terminally ill with plague (between 15 and 50, sources vary) and not expected to recover through an opium overdose, to relieve their suffering, ease the retreat, prevent the spread of the disease and prevent the torture and executions the soldiers left behind would have received if captured by the enemy; his doctors refused to carry out such orders but there is also evidence in the form of first-hand testimonies that claim the mass euthanasia did take place, and the matter remains one for debate.

Back in Egypt
Finally, after four months away from Egypt, the expedition arrived back at Cairo with 1,800 wounded, having lost 600 men to the plague and 1,200 to enemy action. In the meantime Ottoman and British emissaries had brought news of Bonaparte's setback at Acre to Egypt, stating that his expeditionary force was largely destroyed and Bonaparte himself was dead. On his return Bonaparte scotched these rumours by re-entering Egypt as if he was at the head of a triumphal army, with his soldiers carrying palm branches, emblems of victory. In his proclamation to the inhabitants of Cairo, Bonaparte told them:
He is back in Cairo, the Bien-Gardé, the head of the French army, general Bonaparte, who loves Mahomet's religion; he is back sound and well, thanking God for the favours he has given him. He has entered Cairo by the gate of Victory. This day is a great day; no one has ever seen its like; all the inhabitants of Cairo have come out to meet him. They have seen and recognised that it is the same commander in chief, Bonaparte, in his own person; but those of Jaffa, having refused to surrender, he handed them all over to pillage and death in his anger. He has destroyed all its ramparts and killed all those found there. There were around 5,000 of Jezzar's troops in Jaffa – he destroyed them all.

Campaigns in Upper Egypt
The French were determined to exterminate the Mamluks or to expel them from Egypt. By that time, the Mamluks were driven out of Faiyum to Upper Egypt. General Desaix informed Bonaparte of his situation, and soon received a reinforcement of 1,000 cavalry and three light artillery pieces, commanded by General Davout.

On 29 December 1798, the French army arrived at Girga, capital of Upper Egypt, and waited there for a flotilla to bring them ammunition. However, twenty days passed without hearing of the flotilla. In the meantime, Mourad Bey had contacted chieftains from Jeddah and Yanbu to cross the Red Sea and to exterminate a handful of infidels who have come to destroy the religion of Mohammed. He also sent emissaries to Nubia to bring reinforcements, and Hassan Bey Jeddaoui who also conjured to join against the enemies of the Quran.

Upon hearing these endeavours, General Davout mobilized his forces on 2–3 January 1799, where he met a multitude of armed men near the village of Sawaqui. The insurgents were easily routed, and eight hundred of them remained on the battlefield. However, the locals kept gathering around Asyut to combat the French. On 8 January, Davout met another local forces at Tahta, where he killed a thousand men and put the rest to flight.

In the meantime, Mourad Bey's army was reinforced by a thousand sheriffs arriving from beyond the Red Sea, two hundred and fifty Mamluks led Hassan bey Jeddaoui and Osman bey Hassan, in addition to Nubians and North Africans led by Sheikh Al-Kilani, where they encamped near the village of Houé, all supported by the inhabitants of Upper Egypt and the Cataracts of the Nile.

Battle of Samhud
The combined Muslim army marched on 21 January 1799 in the desert, until they reached Samhud near Qena. On 22 January, Desaix formed three squares, two infantry and one cavalry. The latter was placed in the centre of the other two, in order to be protected. The French were scarcely drawn up in line, as the enemy cavalry completely surrounded them, while a column of Arabs from Yanbu fired continuously on their left. Desaix instructed the riflemen of the 96th Infantry Regiment to attack them, while Rapp and Savary, at the head of a squadron of cavalry, would charge the enemy in flank.

The Arabs were attacked so vividly which forced them to flee, leaving about thirty of their own in the square, both killed and wounded. Afterwards, the Arabs of Yanbu, having rallied, came back to attack, and wanted to capture the village of Samhud, but the riflemen of the 96th Infantry Regiment assaulted them viciously and directed against them such a sustained fire, in which they were obliged to withdraw, after having lost many people.

However, the numerous Muslim forces were advancing, uttering frightful cries, and the Mamluks swooped down on the squares commanded by the generals, Friant and Belliard, but they were so strongly repulsed by artillery and musketry fire that they had to withdraw, leaving the battlefield strewn with their dead.

Mourad Bey and Osman bey Hassan, who commanded the Mamluk corps, could not stand against the charge of Davout's cavalry. They abandoned their positions, and dragged the whole army in their flight. The French pursued their enemies until the next day, and did not stop until after having pushed them beyond the Cataracts of the Nile.

Battle of Aswan
Desaix continued to march south, as he reached Esneh on 9 February. Meanwhile, Osman bey Hassan had stationed his forces at the foot of a mountain near Aswan. On 12 February, General Davout discovered the enemy positions and immediately made his military arrangements. He formed his cavalry in two lines, and, in this order of battle, he swooped down on the Mamluks. Osman bey Hassan was dangerously wounded, as he saw his horse killed under him. The French cavalry rushed with such impetuosity on the Muslims, and the fight turned into fury. However, the Mamluks were defeated and forced to abandon the battlefield.

Massacre of Qena
By the end of February 1799, Sherif Hassan and 2,000 Infantry arrived from Mecca. When Desaix and his forces reached Asyut, his flotilla was left behind near Qena. On 3 March, Muslims launched an attack on the flotilla which was called "L' Italie" led by Captain Morandi with 200 marines and 300 wounded and blind on board. Morandi tried to manoeuvre but the vessel was boarded by hundreds of invaders, in which he ordered that the vessel to be set on fire. He was later killed by rain of hostile bullets. However, all on board were eventually mutilated and killed.

Battle of Abnud
On 8 March 1799, General Belliard led his forces to fight 3,000 Meccan Infantry and 350 Mamluks in the plain of Abnud, located on the right bank of the Nile to the south of Qena. The French with their square formation managed to advance on the Muslims forces who later garrisoned themselves in the houses of Abnud. The fighting lasted for hours, afterward, the French managed to reach the courtyard of the village and set the houses on fire. The Muslims were forced to escape and the remaining injured were all killed.

Battle of Beni Adi
The Mamluks maintained with their strategy of inciting the locals against the French forces. On 1 May 1799, General Davout's forces killed at least 2,000 fellahin at Beni Adi near Asyut. However, as they were pursuing Murad Bey into Upper Egypt, the French discovered the monuments at Dendera, Thebes, Edfu and Philae.

Capture of Kosseir
On 29 May 1799, General Belliard managed to capture Kosseir on the Red Sea, after he marched through the desert, to halt further incoming of Meccan troops or any possible invasion from the English.

Abukir to withdrawal

Land battle at Abukir

At Cairo the army found the rest and supplies it needed to recover, but its stay there could not be a long one. Bonaparte had been informed that Murad Bey had evaded the pursuit by Generals Desaix, Belliard, Donzelot and Davout and was descending on Lower Egypt. Bonaparte thus marched to attack him at Giza, also learning that 100 Ottoman ships were off Aboukir, threatening Alexandria.

Without losing time or returning to Cairo, Bonaparte ordered his generals to make all speed to meet the army commanded by the pasha of Rumelia, Saïd-Mustapha, which had joined up with the forces under Murad Bey and Ibrahim. Before leaving Giza, where he found them, Bonaparte wrote to Cairo's divan, stating:
Eighty ships have dared to attack Alexandria but, beaten back by the artillery in that place, they have gone to anchor in Aboukir Bay, where they began disembarking [troops]. I leave them to do this, since my intention is to attack them, to kill all those who do not wish to surrender, and to leave others alive to be led in triumph to Cairo. This will be a handsome spectacle for the city.

First Bonaparte advanced to Alexandria, from which he marched to Aboukir, whose fort was now strongly garrisoned by the Ottomans. Bonaparte deployed his army so that Mustapha would have to win or die with all his family. Mustapha's army was 18,000 strong and supported by several cannons, with trenches defending it on the landward side and free communication with the Ottoman fleet on the seaward side. Bonaparte ordered an attack on 25 July and the Battle of Abukir ensued. In a few hours the trenches were taken, 10,000 Ottomans drowned in the sea  and the rest captured or killed. Most of the credit for the French victory that day goes to Murat, who captured Mustapha himself. Mustapha's son was in command of the fort and he and all his officers survived but were captured and sent back to Cairo as part of the French triumphal procession. Seeing Bonaparte return with these high-ranking prisoners, the population of Cairo superstitiously welcomed him as a prophet-warrior who had predicted his own triumph with such remarkable precision.

Bonaparte leaves Egypt
The land battle at Abukir was Bonaparte's last action in Egypt, partly restoring his reputation after the French naval defeat at the same place a year earlier. With the Egyptian campaign stagnating and political instability developing back home, a new phase in Bonaparte's career was beginning – he felt that he had nothing left to do in Egypt which was worthy of his ambition and that (as had been shown by the defeat at Acre) the forces he had left to him there were not sufficient for an expedition of any importance outside of Egypt. He also foresaw that the army was getting yet weaker from losses in battle and to disease and would soon have to surrender and be taken prisoner by its enemies, which would destroy all the prestige he had won by his many victories. Bonaparte thus spontaneously decided to return to France. During the prisoner exchange at Aboukir and notably via the Gazette de Francfort Sidney Smith had sent him, he was in communication with the British fleet, from which he had learned of events in France. As Bonaparte saw (and later mythologised) France was thrown back into retreat, its enemies had recaptured France's conquests, France was unhappy at its dictatorial government and was nostalgic for the glorious peace it had signed in the Treaty of Campo Formio – as Bonaparte saw it, this meant France needed him and would welcome him back.

He only shared the secret of his return with a small number of friends whose discretion and loyalty were well-known. He left Cairo in August on the pretext of a voyage in the Nile Delta without arousing suspicion, accompanied by the scholars Monge and Berthollet, the painter Denon, and generals Berthier, Murat, Lannes and Marmont. On 23 August, a proclamation informed the army that Bonaparte had transferred his powers as commander in chief to General Kléber. This news was taken badly, with the soldiers angry with Bonaparte and the French government for leaving them behind, but this indignation soon ended, since the troops were confident in Kléber, who convinced them that Bonaparte had not left permanently but would soon be back with reinforcements from France. As night fell, the frigate Muiron silently moored by the shore, with three other ships escorting her. Some became worried when a British corvette was sighted at the moment of departure, but Bonaparte cried "Bah! We'll get there, luck has never abandoned us, we shall get there, despite the English."

Bonaparte's voyage to France
On their 41-day voyage back they did not meet a single enemy ship to stop them, with some sources suggesting that Bonaparte had purchased the British fleet's neutrality via a tacit agreement, though others hold this unlikely, since many would argue that he also had a pact with Nelson to leave him to board on the Egyptian coast unopposed with the fleet bearing his large army. It has been suggested that Sidney Smith and other British commanders in the Mediterranean helped Napoleon evade the British blockade, thinking that he might act as a Royalist element back in France, but there is no solid historical evidence in support of this conjecture.

On 1 October, Napoleon's small flotilla entered port at Ajaccio, where contrary winds kept them until 8 October, when they set out for France. This was the last time Napoleon set foot upon his birthland. When the coast came in sight, ten British ships were sighted. Contre-amiral Ganteaume suggested changing course towards Corsica, but Bonaparte said "No, this manoeuvre would lead us to England, and I want to get to France." This courageous act saved them and on 8 October (16 vendémiaire year VIII) the frigates anchored in the roads off Fréjus. As there were no sick men on board and the plague in Egypt had ended six months before their departure, Bonaparte and his entourage were allowed to land immediately without waiting in quarantine. At 6 pm he set off for Paris, accompanied by his chief of staff Berthier. He stopped off at Saint-Raphaël, where he built a pyramid commemorating the expedition.

Siege of Damietta
On 1 November 1799, the British fleet commanded by Admiral Sidney Smith unloaded an army of Janissaries near Damietta, between Lake Manzala and the sea. The garrison of Damietta, 800 infantry and 150 cavalry strong, commanded by General Jean-Antoine Verdier encountered the Turks. According to Kléber's report, 2,000 to 3,000 Janissaries were killed or drowned and 800 surrendered, including their leader Ismaël Bey. The Turks also lost 32 standards and 5 cannons.

End of the campaign

The troops Bonaparte left behind were supposed to be honourably evacuated under the terms of the Convention of El Arish Kléber had negotiated with Smith and the Ottoman commander Kör Yusuf in early 1800, but Britain refused to sign and Kör Yusuf sent an amphibious assault force of 30,000 Mamlukes against Kléber.

Kléber defeated the Mamlukes at the battle of Heliopolis in March 1800, and then suppressed an insurrection in Cairo. On 14 June (26 prairial), a Syrian student called Suleiman al-Halabi assassinated Kléber with a dagger in the heart, chest, left forearm and right thigh. Command of the French army passed to General Menou, who held command from 3 July until August 1801. Menou's letter was published in Le Moniteur on 6 September, with the conclusions of the committee charged with judging those responsible for the assassination:
The committee, after carrying through the trial with all due solemnity and process, thought it necessary to follow Egyptian customs in its application of punishment; it condemned the assassin to be impaled after having his right hand burned; and three of the guilty sheikhs to be beheaded and their bodies burned.

The Anglo-Ottomans then commenced their land offensive, the French were defeated by the British in the Battle of Alexandria on March 21, surrendered at Fort Julien in April and then Cairo fell in June. Finally besieged in Alexandria from 17 August – 2 September, Menou eventually capitulated to the British. Under the terms of his capitulation, the British General John Hely-Hutchinson allowed the French army to be repatriated in British ships. Menou also signed over to Britain the priceless hoard of Egyptian antiquities such as the Rosetta Stone which it had collected. After initial talks in Al Arish on 30 January 1802, the Treaty of Paris on 25 June ended all hostilities between France and the Ottoman Empire, returning Egypt to the Ottomans.

Scientific expedition

An unusual aspect of the Egyptian expedition was the inclusion of an enormous contingent of scientists and scholars ("savants") assigned to the invading French force, 167 in total. This deployment of intellectual resources is considered as an indication of Napoleon's devotion to the principles of the Enlightenment, and by others as a masterstroke of propaganda obfuscating the true motives of the invasion: the increase of Bonaparte's power.

These scholars included engineers and artists, members of the Commission des Sciences et des Arts, the geologist Dolomieu, Henri-Joseph Redouté, the mathematician Gaspard Monge (a founding member of the École polytechnique), the chemist Claude Louis Berthollet, Vivant Denon, the mathematician Jean-Joseph Fourier (who did some of the empirical work upon which his "analytical theory of heat" was founded in Egypt), the physicist Étienne Malus, the naturalist Étienne Geoffroy Saint-Hilaire, the botanist Alire Raffeneau-Delile, and the engineer Nicolas-Jacques Conté of the Conservatoire national des arts et métiers.

Their original aim was to help the army, notably by opening a Suez Canal, mapping out roads and building mills to supply food. They founded the Institut d'Égypte with the aim of propagating Enlightenment values in Egypt through interdisciplinary work, improving its agricultural and architectural techniques for example. A scientific review was created under the title Décade égyptienne and in the course of the expedition the scholars also observed and drew the flora and fauna in Egypt and became interested in the country's resources. The Egyptian Institute saw the construction of laboratories, libraries, and a printing press. The group worked prodigiously, and some of their discoveries were not finally cataloged until the 1820s.

A young engineering officer, Pierre-François-Xavier Bouchard, discovered the Rosetta Stone in July 1799. Many of the antiquities collected by the French in Egypt were seized by the British Navy and ended up in the British Museum – only about 50 of the 5,000 Egyptian objects in the Louvre were collected during the 1799–1801 Egyptian expedition. Even so, the scholars' research in Egypt gave rise to the 4-volume Mémoires sur l'Égypte (published 1798–1801). A subsequent and more comprehensive text was Description de l'Égypte, published on Napoleon's orders between 1809 and 1821. Publications such as these of Napoleon's discoveries in Egypt gave rise to fascination with Ancient Egyptian culture and the birth of Egyptology in Europe.

The scientists also tested methods in hot air ballooning while in Egypt. Several months after the Cairo Revolt in 1798, inventor Nicolas-Jacques Conté and mathematician Gaspard Monge built a hot air balloon from paper, coloured with the tricolour red, white and blue of the French Republic. They launched the balloon above Azbakiyya Square above a crowd of spectators, but the balloon soon fell to earth, causing panic among the spectators. The French had also planned to demonstrate hot air balloon flight during their celebrations of the anniversary of the founding of the French Republic in 1798, but the scientists had lost their equipment at the Battle of the Nile.

Printing press

The printing press was first introduced to Egypt by Napoleon. He brought with his expedition a French, Arabic, and Greek printing press, which were far superior in speed, efficiency and quality to the nearest presses used in Istanbul. In the Middle East, Africa, India and even much of Eastern Europe and Russia, printing was a minor, specialised activity until the 18th century at least. From about 1720, the Mutaferrika Press in Istanbul produced substantial amounts of printing, some of which the Egyptian clerics were aware of at the time. Juan Cole reports that, "Bonaparte was a master of what we would now call spin, and his genius for it is demonstrated by reports in Arabic sources that several of his more outlandish allegations were actually taken seriously in the Egyptian countryside."

Bonaparte's initial use of Arabic in his printed proclamations was rife with error. In addition to much of the awkwardly translated Arabic wording being unsound grammatically, often the proclamations were so poorly constructed that they were undecipherable. The French Orientalist Jean Michel de Venture de Paradis, plausibly with the help of Maltese assistants, was responsible for translating the first of Napoleon's French proclamations into Arabic. The Maltese language is distantly related to the Egyptian dialect; and classical Arabic differs greatly in grammar, vocabulary, and idiom. Venture de Paradis, who had lived in Tunis, understood Arabic grammar and vocabulary, but did not know how to use them idiomatically.

The Sunni Muslim clerics of the Al-Azhar University in Cairo reacted incredulously to Napoleon's proclamations. Abd al-Rahman al-Jabarti, a Cairene cleric and historian, received the proclamations with a combination of amusement, bewilderment, and outrage. He berated the French's poor Arabic grammar and the infelicitous style of their proclamations. Over the course of Napoleon's invasion of Egypt, al-Jabarti wrote a wealth of material regarding the French and their occupation tactics. Among his observations, he rejected Napoleon's claim that the French were "muslims" (the wrong noun case was used in the Arabic proclamation, making it a lower case "m") and poorly understood the French concept of a republic and democracy– words which did not exist at the time in Arabic.

Analysis
In addition to its significance in the wider French Revolutionary Wars, the campaign had a powerful impact on the Ottoman Empire in general, and the Arab world in particular. The invasion demonstrated the military, technological, and organisational superiority of the Western European powers to the Middle East. This led to profound social changes in the region. The invasion introduced Western inventions, such as the printing press, and ideas, such as liberalism and incipient nationalism, to the Middle East, eventually leading to the establishment of Egyptian independence and modernisation under Muhammad Ali Pasha in the first half of the 19th century and eventually the Nahda, or Arab Renaissance. To modernist historians, the French arrival marks the start of the modern Middle East. Napoleon's astonishing destruction of the conventional Mamluk soldiers at the Battle of the Pyramids served as a reminder for modernising Muslim monarchs to implement wide-ranging military reforms.

While the Egyptian Islamic scholar and historian Al-Jabarti was critical of Napoleon and the French, he preferred them over the Ottomans. To Jabarti, Napoleon was compassionate towards Muslims and poor folk and he safeguarded the lives of innocents and civilians. This was at odds with the "arrogance, cruelty and tyranny" of Ottoman rule, which he characterised as an un-Islamic system marked by corruption, backwardness and summary executions. Although critical of the French Republic and French Revolution, both Jabarti and his disciple Hassan Al-Attar were astonished by French technological advancements and appreciated the fair trials in the French judicial system.

The campaign ultimately ended in failure, with 15,000 French troops killed in action and 15,000 by disease. Napoleon's reputation as a brilliant military commander remained intact and continued to increase, despite some of his failures during the campaign. This was due to his expert propaganda, such as his Courrier de l'Égypte, set up to propagandise the expeditionary force itself and support its morale. Such propaganda spread back to France, where news of defeats such as at sea in Aboukir Bay and on land in Syria were suppressed. Defeats could be blamed on the now-assassinated Kléber, leaving Napoleon free from blame and with a burnished reputation. This opened his way to power and he profited from his reputation by engineering his becoming First Consul in the coup d'état of 18 brumaire (November 1799).

Charges of imperialism

Napoleonic invasion of Egypt is widely regarded in contemporary academic circles to be "the first act of modern European imperialism" and also criticised for its role in shaping the civilizing mission narrative of 19th century  European colonial empires.

According to Professor Edward W. Said, Napoleonic invasion led to the dominance of Orientalist narratives of the Muslim world:"with Napoleon's occupation of Egypt, processes were set in motion between East and West that still dominate our contemporary cultural and political perspectives. And the Napoleonic expedition, with its great collective monument of erudition, the Description de l'Égypte, provided a scene or setting for Orientalism.. Napoleon's invasion of Egypt in 1798 and his foray into Syria have had by far the greater consequence for the modern history of Orientalism."

Mamelukes in French service
Colonel Barthelemy Serra took the first steps towards creating a Mameluke Corps in France. On September 27, 1800, he wrote a letter from Cairo to the first consul, couched in an Oriental style. He regretted being very far away from Napoleon and offered his total devotion to the French nation and expressed the Mamelukes' wish to become the bodyguard to the first consul. They wished to serve him as living shields against those who would seek to harm him. The first consul became receptive of admitting a unit of carefully selected cavalrymen as his personal guard. He had an officer pay appropriate respects to the foreign troops and provided Napoleon himself with a full report to the number of refugees.

French order of battle

British order of battle

British Army 
The British Army in Egypt, as it was known was the colloquial name of the forces under command of General Ralph Abercromby, the armies order of battle in March 1800 was;
 Commanding General, General Ralph Abercromby
 Chief of Staff, Lieutenant General H. Hutchinson
 Cavalry Division
 Cavalry Brigade, commanded by Brigadier General Edward Finch
 11th Light Dragoons
 12th (The Prince of Wales's) Light Dragoons
 26th Light Dragoons
 Hompesch's Hussars (3 Sqns)
 Infantry Division
 Guards Brigade, commanded by Major General Ludlow
 1st Battalion, Coldstream Regiment of Foot Guards
 1st Battalion, 3rd Regiment of Foot Guards
 1st Brigade, commanded by Major General Eyre Coote
 1st (Royal) Regiment of Foot
 54th (West Norfolk) Regiment of Foot
 92nd (Gordon Highlanders) Regiment of Foot
 2nd Brigade, commanded by Major General John Cradock, 1st Baron Howden
 8th (The King's) Regiment of Foot
 13th (1st Somersetshire, Prince Albert's Light Infantry) Regiment of Foot
 90th Regiment of Foot (Perthshire Volunteers)
 3rd Brigade, commanded by Major General Richard Lambart, 7th Earl of Cavan
 2nd (Queen's Royal) Regiment of Foot
 50th (Queen's Own) Regiment of Foot
 79th (Queen's Own Cameron Highlanders) Regiment of Foot
 4th Brigade, commanded by Major General Sir John Doyle, 1st Baronet
 18th (The Royal Irish) Regiment of Foot
 30th (Cambridgeshire) Regiment of Foot
 44th (East Essex) Regiment of Foot
 89th (Princess Victoria's) Regiment of Foot
 5th Brigade, commanded by Major General Charles Stuart (mostly foreign troops)
 Minorca Regiment
 Régiment de Roll (French royalist/emigre)
 Dillon's Regiment (French royalist/emigre)
 6th Brigade, commanded by Major General John Moore
 23rd (Royal Welsh Fusiliers) Regiment of Foot
 28th (North Gloucestershire) Regiment of Foot
 40th (the 2nd Somersetshire) Regiment of Foot (3 coys)
 42nd (Highland) Regiment of Foot (The Black Watch)
 58th (Rutlandshire) Regiment of Foot
 Royal Corsican Rangers
 Artillery & Engineers, commanded by Brigadier General Robert Lawson
 No.5 Company, 1st Battalion, Royal Artillery under Captain William Mudge
 No.7 Company, 1st Battalion, Royal Artillery under Captain John Lemoine
 No.1 Company, 2nd Battalion, Royal Artillery under Captain Thomas Charleton
 No.5 Company, 3rd Battalion, Royal Artillery under Captain William Bentham
 No.5 Company, 5th Battalion, Royal Artillery under Captain F. M. Sproule
 No.6 Company, 5th Battalion, Royal Artillery under Captain G. Cookson
 No.7 Company, 5th Battalion, Royal Artillery under Captain I. Wood
 (detachments) No.2 Company, 2nd Battalion, Royal Artillery under Captain Daniel Gahan
 (detachments) No.4 Company, 2nd Battalion, Royal Artillery under Captain Henry Thomson
 (detachments) No.3 Company, 4th Battalion, Royal Artillery under Captain W. Wilson
 Maltese Pioneers
 500 sailors assigned to the artillery
 Coming from Egypt, troops commanded by Major General Sir David Baird, 1st Baronet (moving from British Raj (India))
 84th (York and Lancaster) Regiment of Foot
 2nd Bombay Native Infantry
 13th Bombay Native Infantry
 (detachment) Madras Artillery
 (detachment) Bombay Artillery
 (detachment) Madras Sappers and Miners

Royal Navy 
The Royal Navy squadron still in the area cruising off Alexandria was organised into;
 Squadron commanded by Captain Samuel Hood
 HMS Zealous (74 guns)
 HMS Goliath (74 guns)
 HMS Swiftsure (74 guns)
 HMS Seahorse (38 guns)
 HMS Emerald (36 guns)
 HMS Alcmene (32 guns)
 HMS Bonne Citoyenne (20 guns)
 HMS Fortune (18 guns)
 HMS Légère (2 guns)
 HMS Toride (2 guns)

Timeline and battles

 1798
 19 May (30 Floréal year VI) – Departure from Toulon
 11 June (23 Prairial year VI) – Capture of Malta
 1 July (13 Messidor year VI) – Landing at Alexandria
 13 July – Battle of Shubra Khit, French victory
 21 July (3 Thermidor year VI) – Battle of the Pyramids, French land victory
 1 and 2 August (14–15 Thermidor year VI) – Battle of the Nile, British naval victory over French squadron anchored in Aboukir Bay
 10 August – Battle at Salheyeh, French victory
 7 October – Battle of Sédiman, French victory
 21 October (30 Vendémiaire) – Cairo Revolt
 1799
 11–19 February – Siege of El Arish, French victory
 7 March – Siege of Jaffa, French victory
 8 April – Battle at Nazareth, French victory, Junot with 500 defeats 3000 Ottoman soldiers
 11 April – Battle of Cana, French victory, Napoleon wins a great battle against Ottomans
 16 April (27 Germinal year VII) – Bonaparte relieves the troops under Kléber just as the latter are about to be overwhelmed at the foot of Mount Tabor
 20 May (1 Prairial an VII) – Siege of Acre, French troops retire after eight assaults
 1 August (14 Thermidor year VII) – Battle of Abukir, French victory
 23 August (6 Fructidor year VII) – Bonaparte embarks on the frigate Muiron and abandons command to Kléber
 1800
 24 January (4 Pluviôse year VIII) – Kléber concludes the Convention of El Arish with the British admiral Sidney Smith
 February (Pluviôse-Ventôse year VIII) – French troops begin their withdrawal, but the British admiral Keith refuses to recognize the convention's terms
 20 March (29 Ventôse year VIII) – Battle of Heliopolis, Kléber wins one last victory, against a force of 30,000 Ottomans
 14 June (25 Prairial year VIII) – A Kurd named Suleiman al-Halabi assassinates Kléber in his garden in Cairo. General Menou, a convert to Islam, takes over command
 3 September (16 Fructidor year VIII) – The British recapture Malta from the French
 1801
 8 March (17 Ventôse year IX) – British landing near Aboukir
 21 March (30 Ventôse year IX) – Battle of Alexandria, French defeat, army under Menou digs in at Alexandria ready for the siege of Alexandria
 31 March (10 Germinal year IX) – Ottoman army arrives at El-Arich
 19 April (29 Germinal year IX)– British and Ottoman forces capture Fort Julien at Rosetta after a four-day bombardment, opening the Nile
 27 June (8 Messidor year IX) – General Belliard surrenders in Cairo
 31 August (13 Fructidor year IX) – Siege of Alexandria ends in Menou's surrender

In popular culture 
 The 2010 video game, Napoleon: Total War, features an Egyptian Campaign, where players can control French armies throughout the campaigns in Egypt and Syria.
 Adieu Bonaparte
 نابليون والمحروسة

See also

 Mediterranean campaign of 1798
 Crusader invasions of Egypt – 1154–1169
 Italian invasion of Egypt – 1940

References

Sources
 Napoleon Was Here! An interactive journey following Napoleon's expedition to Egypt, The National Library of Israel
 
 
 Burleigh, Nina. Mirage. Harper, New York, 2007. 
 
 
 
 Jourquin, Jacques, Journal du capitaine François dit 'le dromadaire d'Égypte''', 2 vol., introduction critique et annexes par Jacques Jourquin, éditions Tallandier (couronné par l'Académie française), 1984, new edition, 2003.
 
 Mackesy, Piers. British Victory in Egypt, 1801: The End of Napoleon's Conquest. Routledge, 2013. 
 Miot, Jacques. Narrative of the French expedition in Egypt, and the operations in Syria. Translated from the French. (1816)
 Miot, Jacques-François. Mémoires pour servir à l’histoire des expéditions en Égypte et en Syrie. Deuxième édition. (1814).
 
 
 Rickard, J French Invasion of Egypt, 1798–1801, (2006)
 
 
 
 Strathern, Paul. Napoleon in Egypt: The Greatest Glory. Jonathan Cape, Random House, London, 2007.  online
 
 Melanie Ulz: Auf dem Schlachtfeld des Empire. Männlichkeitskonzepte in der Bildproduktion zu Napoleons Ägyptenfeldzug'' (Marburg: Jonas Verlag 2008), .
 Napoleonic Egypt Digital Collection; Rare Books and Special Collections Library; the American University in Cairo

External links 
 

 
Conflicts in 1798
Conflicts in 1799
Conflicts in 1800
Conflicts in 1801
Egypt and Syria
Military history of Egypt
Napoleonic Wars
History of Ottoman Syria
Wars involving Ottoman Egypt
Wars involving the United Kingdom
18th century in France
19th century in France
18th century in Egypt
19th century in Egypt
1798 in Egypt
1799 in Egypt
1800 in Egypt
1801 in Egypt
1799 in Ottoman Syria
French colonisation in Africa
18th century in the British Empire
19th century in the British Empire
Invasions of Ottoman Egypt
Invasions of Ottoman Syria
Egypt–France relations